Pueblo Nuevo District is one of the three districts of the Chepén Province in the La Libertad Region, Peru.

Localities
Some localities of Pueblo Nuevo District are:
Chérrepe
El Milagro
Huacablanca

Nearby cities
Chepén
Guadalupe
Pacasmayo

See also
Jequetepeque Valley
Pacasmayo
Chepén

References

External links
Location of Pueblo Nuevo by Wikimapia